Batting may refer to:

Batting (baseball), the act of attempting to hit a ball thrown by the pitcher with a baseball bat, in order to score runs
Batting (cricket), the act of defending one's wicket with the cricket bat while attempting to score runs
Padding, a layer of insulation between a top layer of patchwork and a layer of backing material in quilting